Emmanuel-Bernard-Philipe Frédéric Delbousquet, French poet and novelist, was born on 27 April 1874 in Sos, Lot-et-Garonne, on the borders of the great Landes de Gascogne and Armagnac, where he died on 20 May 1909. He devoted his short life to his inner passion to go horse riding, a subject which naturally became a recurring theme of his works, both in French and Occitan language.

Life
During his short stay in Toulouse in 1891, for the meeting of the group of literature L’Esquile, he founded with Louis Magre and Marc Lafargue the first poetic magazine of the school of Toulouse which appeared in March 1892 and was entitled Les Essais de Jeunes, later becoming L'Effort in March 1896. They asserted their originality by repudiating the romantic ressassement, the decadent and the Symbolists. He also collaborated with La France de Bordeaux, Télégramme de Toulouse, l'A me Latine, la Revue Provinciale, la Revue Méridionale, l’Ermitage, and the Midi Fédéral, a weekly newspaper that had all major southern writers as collaborators, including Laurent Tailhade, Emile Pouvillen, Louis-Xavier de Ricard and Jean Carrère.

Aware of a southern poetry renaissance, the young poet also unites around him the enthusiasm of Joseph Bosc, Jean Viollis, Maurice Magre. Back in Sos, he tried an autobiographical novel entitled Le Reflet, written in 1901, but at the last moment he refused to publish this work considered too clumsy and bombastic. Preferring to translate his land, he developed a script under a more colorful and impressionistic palette. Mindful about realism, his hardworking efforts to recover occitan as language of origin and remembrance, under the leadership of his friend and master Antonin Perbosc, he intersperses his romantic work with gascon terms and expressions. However, it was necessary to wait for the posthumous publication of his collection of poems entitled Capbat Lana by Antonin Perbosc in 1924, for one to see the birth of the félibre Delbousquet.

Literary works
 En les Landes, preface by René Ghil, Melle, 1892
 Eglogues, 1897 
 Le Mazareilh, Paul Ollendorff - Paris, 1901
 Margot, Société provinciale d’édition - Toulouse, 1903
 L'Écarteur, romance, Ollendorff - Paris, 1904. Reed. David Chabas, Capbreton, 1974
 Miguette de Cante-Cigale, romance landais, Paris, 1908
 Le Chant de la race, Poems 1893-1907, Paris, 1908
 Contes de la lande gasconne, Paris, 1923
 Capbat la Lana, dans l'estampèl de Antonin Perbósc, 1924
 En Gascogne, Saint-Sever-sur-Adour, 1929
 Le Renard, story collection published in La France de Bordeaux from 1905 to 1907, Garein (40420, Labrit) : Ed. Ultreïa, 1990
 Œuvres complètes (Complete Works) Nérac : Amis du Vieux Nérac (Friends of Old Nerac), 5 vol., 2000-2002

Additional information

References

Attribution
This article is based on the translation of the corresponding article of the French Wikipedia. A list of contributors can be found there at the History section.

Sources
Nathalie Declochez, « L'inceste dans Le Mazareilh de Delbousquet. Provocation ou plaidoyer pour un passé ? », in Bulletin de la Société des Amis du Vieux Nérac, n° 27, 1999
Nathalie Declochez, préface des Contes, nouvelles et récits de la Lande et de la Gascogne, Amis du Vieux Nérac, 2000
Nathalie Declochez, « Emmanuel Delbousquet, écrivain impressionniste », in Emmanuel Delbousquet : actes du colloque Gabarret-Sos, 2001, t. V, Amis du Vieux Nérac et Société de Borda, Nérac, 2001

External links
 L'Écarteur by Emmanuel Delbousquet at the Internet Archive
 French Wikisource has original text related to this article: Emmanuel Delbousquet.

1874 births
1909 deaths
19th-century French novelists
20th-century French novelists
French poets
Occitan poets
French male poets
French male novelists
19th-century poets
19th-century French male writers
20th-century French male writers
French-language Occitan writers
Occitan-language Occitan writers